Ischiodon is a genus of hoverfly found in Africa.

Species

Ischiodon aegyptius (Wiedemann, 1830)
Ischiodon feae (Bezzi, 1912)
Ischiodon scutellaris

References

Diptera of Africa
Hoverfly genera
Syrphini